Texas Shuffle is an album by blues guitarist Rocky Hill. The album features Johnny Winter and Dr. John.

Track listing

References

1982 albums
Tomato Records albums
Rocky Hill (musician) albums